Agami (mostly shortened to , ;) is a city in the Alexandria Governorate of Egypt.  west of Alexandria, the town is a popular destination for both local Alexandrians and tourists in Giza and Cairo.

Overview 

The city started as a compound for the elite class of Egypt in the 1950s. The city is a popular local tourist destination for middle-class Egyptians, famous for its turquoise waters. The city also has a number of monuments, including a French fort built during the French campaign in Egypt under Napoleon Bonaparte, and also has several watch towers built during the Ottoman era.

The city was also a famous hunting spot in the early 1940s for hunting turtles, doves, and quails.

Climate 
Köppen-Geiger climate classification system classifies its climate as hot desert (BWh), but prevailing Mediterranean Sea winds highly moderate the temperatures, which is similar to the rest of the northern coast of Egypt. Its climate is very similar to Alexandria, but Alexandria is wetter.

Location 

The city has flourished mainly for its relatively small distance from Alexandria and its location on the intersection of Cairo-Alexandria Desert Road and the North Coast road, which made it a favoured spot for vacationers in Egypt.

Neighborhoods 
 Abu Yusuf
 Nakheel
 Bitash
 Hanoville
 Dekhela
 Sidi Kreir

Gallery

References 

Populated places in Alexandria Governorate